Walter Hochmaier (born 28 September 1968) is an Austrian footballer. He played in three matches for the Austria national football team in 1994.

References

External links
 

1968 births
Living people
Austrian footballers
Austria international footballers
Place of birth missing (living people)
Association footballers not categorized by position